The Lincoln YWCA Building is a historic three-story building in Lincoln, Nebraska. It was built in 1932 for the Young Men's Christian Association (YMCA), and designed in the Georgian Revival style by architects Meginnis & Schaumberg, with an "entrance frontispiece, fluted pilasters, window lintels, inset panels, and blind balustrades;-darker brickwork simulating quoins at corners and diaperwork on side walls." It has been listed on the National Register of Historic Places since June 21, 1984.

References

National Register of Historic Places in Lincoln, Nebraska
Georgian Revival architecture in Nebraska
Buildings and structures completed in 1932
YMCA buildings in the United States